Oberea fusciventris is a species of beetle in the family Cerambycidae. It was described by Léon Fairmaire in 1895.

References

fusciventris
Beetles described in 1895